Kotli Tungal (Kotli) is a small town in Himachal Pradesh, in northern India located along national highway 70 (updated 003) which connect Jalandhar (in Punjab) to Mandi. Kotli and the surrounding area are also known as Tungal valley. The center of Tungal Valley is Kotli, where The NH 70 (003) from Mandi to Jalandhar passes through Kotli. Tungal valley is covered with lush green forests of oak and cedar deodar. Rechara Dev Temple, Mahan Dev Temple, Kali mata temple, Janitri mata temple, Nagan mata mandir, Jhumba Ri Jogni Mata Temple are the main temples of the area. Pahari and Hindi are spoken.

Patwar Circle in Sub Division Kotli

Gram Panchyat Under Sub Division and Tehsil Kotli

Villages in Kotli Tehsil

Education 
Government Degree College Kotli
Government Industrial Training Institute Kotli

Access
Kotli Tungal is well Connected by National Highway 003 with district headquartersMandi,
Distance from Delhi: 
Distance from Chandigarh: 
Distance from Shimla: 
Distance from Mandi:

References 

Cities and towns in Mandi district